Gol-e Chaharabad-e Sadat Mahmudi (also Romanized as Gol-e Chaharābād-e Sādāt Maḩmūdī; also known as Gol-e Chaharābād) is a village in Sadat Mahmudi Rural District, Pataveh District, Dana County, Kohgiluyeh and Boyer-Ahmad Province, Iran. At the 2006 census, its population was 115, in 21 families.

References 

Populated places in Dana County